The 1980 World Series of Poker (WSOP) was a series of poker tournaments held at Binion's Horseshoe.

Preliminary events

Main Event

There were 73 entrants to the main event, with each paying an entry fee of $10,000. The 1980 Main Event was Ungar's first of three main event championship victories.

Final table

References

World Series of Poker
World Series of Poker